Aminadav is a moshav in central Israel. Located southwest of Jerusalem near Yad Kennedy, it falls under the jurisdiction of Mateh Yehuda Regional Council.

Etymology
The name "Aminadav" is a combination of two Hebrew words; "Ami"- my nation, and "Nadav"- generous, giving, or volunteering; thus Aminadav translates "a generous people" and the moshav is named after biblical Aminadav(Exodus 6:23 et al.); "Nachshon ben Aminadav" was the first man to enter the "Red Sea" as the Jews left slavery in Egypt.

History
The village was established in 1950 by Yemeni Jews.  Between 1952 and 1953 it absorbed more immigrants from North Africa as well as some native Israelis.

Aminadav was located on land that had belonged to the Palestinian village of al-Walaja.

Aminadav forest
The Aminadav Forest, spread over 7 km2 (700 ha), is a combination of natural woodland and trees planted by the Jewish National Fund along the Salmon-Sorek contour. The forest overlooks the Sorek and Refa`im riverbeds and the Jerusalem hills.  In the forest are several natural springs, ancient agricultural terraces, orchards, ancient wine presses and chalk pits. The Lord Sacks forest is a forest of 25,000 trees being planted within the Aminadav forest by the JNF, UK. It is named for  Chief Rabbi of the United Hebrew Congregations of the Commonwealth, Lord Jonathan Sacks.

See also
List of forests in Israel

References

Moshavim
Populated places established in 1950
Populated places in Jerusalem District
Yemeni-Jewish culture in Israel